The Iranian Volleyball Super League 2011–12 was the 25th season of the Iranian Volleyball Super League, the highest professional volleyball league in Iran. The season started on 19 October 2011 and ended on 19 March 2012.

Regular season

Standings

Results

 The match between Shahrdari Urmia and Aluminium Al-Mahdi Hormozgan did not take place.

Playoffs

Semifinals
Saipa vs. Shahrdari Urmia

|}

Kalleh vs. Paykan

|}

3rd place
Shahrdari Urmia vs. Paykan

|}

 Paykan and Shahrdari Urmia shared the third place.

Final
Saipa vs. Kalleh

|}

Final standings

References
General
Regular Season Results
Regular Season Standings
Playoffs Results

Specific

External links
Iran Volleyball Federation
radiovarzesh.ir

League 2011-12
Iran Super League, 2011-12
Iran Super League, 2011-12
Volleyball League, 2011-12
Volleyball League, 2011-12